The Seagrasses of Western Australia are submerged flowering plants found along the coast, around islands, and in Estuaries of Western Australia. The region contains some of the largest seagrass meadows in the world, and is the most diverse in the number of species. The variety of habitats along its western and southern coasts is often soft sands in shallow subtropical waters, ideal for these plants.

Description
Marine grasses are flowering plants that evolved from terrestrial grasses to habitat in coastal waters. In contrast to seaweeds, usually found on rocks, seagrass colonises sandy ocean beds to form dense stands and meadows.

The Western Australian coastline, along with its islands, is over 20,000 km long. These tropical to temperate waters extend from latitudes 32-34°S to 12°S. The great diversity of habitat in these coastal regions of Western Australia are occupied by seagrasses, frequently 'engineering' habitat through colonisation of shallow ocean floors. These plants possess rhizomes which extend under the sand, stems emerge from these with one, or many, flattened and elongated leaves. These features allow the plants to stabilise the substrate, anchor themselves against currents, and change the environment.  
 
A colony may have one or several species of seagrass, and a large number of other species living within it. 
The area covered by seagrass in Western Australian waters is equivalent to Australia's rainforest.

Distribution
The range extends to the temperate regions of the Southern Ocean. Some areas of the southern coast provide suitable habitat, such as those at King George Sound and the Archipelago of the Recherche, the warmer water of the Leeuwin Current contributes the diversity of these seagrass communities. The western coast contain notable and diverse seagrass beds; Cockburn Sound and the Swan River estuary, and the Houtman Abrolhos, Rottnest and other islands. The Wooramel Seagrass Bank 12 species - estimated 4,500 km² of seabed - at Shark Bay is the largest reported seagrass meadows in the world (Walker, 1989). The Timor Sea is largely unsurveyed.

Ecosystem
Seagrasses are the foundation of complex ecosystems, primarily from the ability to colonise inshore coastal sand with its roots and matted rhizomes. These meadows are able to provide habitat to other species, especially epiphytic relationships, and are a food source for other organisms. Western rock lobsters are found as juveniles amongst seagrass, receiving food and shelter until they reach maturity. The leaves are also eaten by dugong and other creatures.

Diversity
The seagrasses of Western Australia are the most diverse of any region in the world, 26 species in 11 genera are currently described.

The four families of Alismatales includes three genera within Hydrocharitaceae, a largely aquatic family of tape grasses, and seven other genera of marine species.

Hydrocharitaceae 
Enhalus acoroides (L.f.) Royle
Halophila australis  Doty & B.C.Stone
Halophila decipiens Ostenf.
 Halophila minor (Zoll.) Hartog
 Halophila ovalis (R.Br.) Hook.f.
 Halophila spinulosa (R.Br.) Asch.
 Thalassia hemprichii (Ehrenb.) Asch.
Cymodoceaceae 
 Amphibolis antarctica (Labill.) Sonder et Aschers. ex Aschers. (Wire weed, Sea Nymph)
 Amphibolis griffithii (J.Black) den Hartog 
 Cymodocea angustata Ostenfeld
 Cymodocea serrulata (R.Br.) Asch. et Magnus
 Halodule pinifolia (Miki) den Hartog
 Halodule uninervis (Forsk.) Aschers.
 Syringodium isoetifolium (Aschers.) Dandy
 Thalassodendron ciliatum (Forrsk.) den Hartog
 Thalassodendron pachyrhizum den Hartog
Posidoniaceae 
 Posidonia angustifolia Cambridge and J.Kuo 
 Posidonia australis Hook.f.   (Ribbon weed)
 Posidonia coriacea Cambridge and J.Kuo
 Posidonia denhartogii J.Kuo and Cambridge
 Posidonia kirkmanii J.Kuo and Cambridge
 Posidonia ostenfeldii den Hartog
 Posidonia robertsoniae J.Kuo and Cambridge
 Posidonia sinuosa Cambridge and J.Kuo
Zosteraceae 
 Heterozostera nigricaulis J.Kuo
 Heterozostera polychlamys J.Kuo
 Zostera muelleri Asch.
 Zostera muelleri subsp. mucronata (Hartog) S.W.L.Jacobs

See also
Coastal regions of Western Australia

Notes

References

 
 New combinations in Australasian Zostera (Zosteraceae). Telopea 11(2) 127-128

External links
  Seagrasses of Western Australia

Further reading
 Thomson, Carolyn (1997) Discovering Shark Bay Marine Park and Monkey Mia Como, W.A. Department of Conservation and Land Management.  pp. 46–47 - includes mention mainly of wireweed and ribbon weed.
 Walker, D.I. (1990) Seagrass in Shark Bay, Western Australia.  In: "Research in Shark Bay: Report of the France-Australe Bicentenary Expedition Committee." (Eds. P.F. Berry, S.D. Bradshaw, B.R. Wilson) (Western Australian Museum, Perth). p. 101-6

Seagrass
Angiosperms of Western Australia
Biota of the Indian Ocean
Coastline of Western Australia
Monocots of Australia